Vangelis Andreou (born 3 September 1990) is a Greek professional footballer who plays as a centre-back for Super League 2 club Niki Volos.

References

1990 births
Living people
Greek footballers
Delta Ethniki players
Football League (Greece) players
Super League Greece 2 players
Gamma Ethniki players
Trikala F.C. players
AO Chania F.C. players
Pierikos F.C. players
Apollon Larissa F.C. players
Doxa Drama F.C. players
Niki Volos F.C. players
Association football defenders
Footballers from Trikala